Deion Jumah (born 18 July 1989) is a former English professional boxer.

Professional career
Jumah made his professional debut on 2 February 2013, scoring a first-round knockout (KO) victory against Ruslan Bitarov at the Max-Schmeling-Halle in Berlin, Germany.

After compiling a record of 10–0 (5 KOs) he faced Ossie Jervier for the vacant Southern Area cruiserweight title on 2 December 2018 at the York Hall in London. Jumah dropped his opponent to the canvas in the fifth round. Jervier made it back to his feet only to be met by a flurry of punches from Jumah, prompting referee Bob Williams to call a halt to the contest to hand Jumah his first professional title via technical knockout (TKO).

In his next fight he returned to the York Hall to face former Commonwealth champion Wadi Camacho for the vacant English cruiserweight title on 7 September 2019. Jumah landed a counter-left hand in the fifth round to knock Camacho to the canvas. The former Commonwealth champion was back to his feet by the referee's count of six. With Camacho looking unsteady, referee Marcus McDonnell called a halt to the contest at the count of eight to hand Jumah his second professional title via TKO.

The first defence of his English title came four months later against Sam Hyde on 19 January at the Woodhouse Park Lifestyle Centre in Manchester. The bout served as a final eliminator for the British cruiserweight title. After twelve closely contested rounds Jumah retained his title with a unanimous decision (UD) victory, becoming the mandatory challenger to reigning British champion Richard Riakporhe. Two judges scored the bout 115–113 and the third judge scored it 115–114.

In October it was announced that Jumah would face Commonwealth cruiserweight champion Chris Billam-Smith on 21 November, with the recently vacated British title also on the line. The bout will serve as part of the undercard for Alexander Povetkin vs. Dillian Whyte II.

Professional boxing record

References

External links

Living people
1989 births
English male boxers
Boxers from Greater London
Cruiserweight boxers
England Boxing champions
Black British sportspeople
Southpaw boxers